Andrew John Volstead (October 31, 1860 – January 20, 1947) was an American member of the United States House of Representatives from Minnesota, 1903–1923, and a member of the Republican Party. His name is closely associated with the National Prohibition Act of 1919, usually called the Volstead Act. The act was the enabling legislation for the enforcement of Prohibition in the United States beginning in 1920.

Early life
Volstead was born in Kenyon, Goodhue County, Minnesota, to Norwegian-American parents Jon Einertson Vraalstad (John Vrolstad), a distant relative of Queen Sonja of Norway, and wife Dorothea Mathea Lillo. He was educated at St. Olaf College, became a lawyer and served as mayor of Granite Falls, Minnesota, from 1900 to 1902. According to his obituary in a 1947 edition of the Minneapolis Star, he first practiced law in Grantsburg, Wisconsin, before moving to Granite Falls in 1886.

Congressional career
While in Congress, he served as chairman of the House Judiciary Committee from 1919 to 1923. Although often considered the author of the Volstead Act, he collaborated with Wayne Wheeler of the Anti-Saloon League, who conceived and largely drafted the bill. However, Volstead sponsored the bill and championed, promoted and facilitated its passage. He also helped author the Capper–Volstead Act, which enabled farmers to form locally owned cooperatives without fear of prosecution under the Sherman Antitrust Act. The law is still in effect.

Volstead was a member of the 58th, 59th, 60th, 61st, 62nd, 63rd, 64th, 65th, 66th, and 67th congresses. He was defeated in his attempt to be elected to an 11th term in 1922. Shortly thereafter he was hired as legal adviser to the chief of the National Prohibition Enforcement Bureau.

Upon repeal of Prohibition in 1933, Volstead returned to Granite Falls, Minnesota, where he resumed the private practice of law.

He died in 1947. Volstead's former home, located at 163 Ninth Avenue, Granite Falls, Minnesota, is a National Historic Landmark. He is buried in the Granite Falls city cemetery.

See also

 List of covers of Time magazine (1920s) – March 29, 1926
 Bootleggers and Baptists

Notes

References

External links

"Norwegian American Hall of Fame"
"National Agriculture Hall of Fame"
"Cooperative Hall of Fame"
"Minnesota Historic Society"
"National Historic Landmarks"

1860 births
1947 deaths
American people of Norwegian descent
American temperance activists
American cooperative organizers
Mayors of places in Minnesota
Prohibition in the United States
Republican Party members of the United States House of Representatives from Minnesota
St. Olaf College alumni
People from Kenyon, Minnesota
People from Granite Falls, Minnesota